Face of the Sun may refer to:

 Sun (heraldry)
 In particular, Sun of May the emblem on the flags of Argentina and Uruguay
 An album by Chris Eskola
 An album by Pete Johansen
 A single by Barry Stagg
 A song from The Space Between the Shadows

See also 
 Face of the Rising Sun (disambiguation)
 Faces to the Sun